is known as the "Tuna King" of Japan. Kimura is the head of Kiyomura Corporation which runs the Sushi Zanmai chain of restaurants. In January 2019, Kimura paid a record 333.6 million yen for a  blue fin tuna and has been the highest bidder at the Japanese new year tuna auction in eight out of the past nine years. The fish normally sells for $88/kilogram.

References 

Living people
Japanese businesspeople
Japanese chief executives
Sushi
Year of birth missing (living people)